"Boom" is a song by American Christian metal band P.O.D. It was released in April 2002 as the third single from their second major label studio album Satellite. While it did not chart as well as the album's previous singles, the song has appeared significantly in film and television. "Boom (The Crystal Method remix)" was included on the remix album Community Service and as a bonus track on the special edition re-release of Satellite available August 27, 2002. A limited edition, gatefold picture disc of the single was also available in the UK.

The single's release followed a highly successful yet dark, brooding tone in "Youth of the Nation". Guitarist Marcos Curiel stated, "We wanted to go back to the spirit we had with 'Alive' and have a song that encourages people to be happy and thankful that they're alive... We wanted to say, 'Let's not forget how to have fun this time.' 'Boom' is just raw, in your face. When we play it live, the crowd just goes nuts. Fists are in the air and the pit's going."

Following the September 11, 2001 attacks, "Boom" was the only P.O.D. song included on the list of songs deemed inappropriate by Clear Channel Communications.

Content
"Boom" has often served as the opening song at P.O.D.'s concerts. The song's lyrics revolve around the band and their San Diego background, describing the group's rise to popularity with lines like "rock the masses, from Madrid to Calabasas." However, the explosive, multitracked "Boom!" of the chorus gives the song its impact and versatility as a soundtrack piece. In contrast to P.O.D.'s more faith-oriented tracks, "Boom" has been described by vocalist Sonny Sandoval as "just a fun rock song."

Music video
The music video for "Boom" was recorded in the first quarter of 2002 and directed by Gavin Bowden, debuting in May with heavy rotation on MTV2 and MMUSA. It is an unusual video for P.O.D. in its obvious sense of humor; "Boom" revolves around a table tennis (aka: Ping Pong) tournament between the band, dressed in orange jumpsuits, and a Swedish team played by fellow Christian metal group Blindside. The latter group was heavily supported by P.O.D. during this time and signed by them under the Elektra Records subsidiary, 3 Points. The teams are evenly matched until Traa Daniels performs a comically impressive move to win the game, enraging their opponents.

Regarding the video, Curiel stated, "The funny thing is, people take us really seriously. We are a serious band, but we know that, at times, we don't have to take ourselves so seriously. We have fun. That's why we went ahead and did a video like 'Boom.' We wanted to show people that we could have fun. They have a movie out now called Balls of Fury, but we did that same topic back in the day."

The music video for "Boom" was No. 8 on TVU's 50 Best Videos of All Time list.

Awards

2002 San Diego Music Awards
 Song of the Year

2003 GMA Dove Awards
 Hard Music Recorded Song of the Year

Track listing
 "Boom"
 "Set it Off" (Tweaker Mix)
 "Hollywood" (Live)

Charts

Release history

In popular culture
 The song appeared in the films Grind, Rollerball (2002 film) and Here Comes the Boom, the latter which was named after a lyric from the song. 
 The song was featured in the 3rd episode of Season 4 of Brooklyn Nine-Nine.
 It was used in a trailer for the video game Bulletstorm.
 It was used by WWE for their Saturday Night's Main Event program from 2006 to 2008.

References

P.O.D. songs
2001 songs
2002 singles
Atlantic Records singles
Song recordings produced by Howard Benson
Songs about California
Songs written by Marcos Curiel
Songs written by Noah Bernardo
Songs written by Sonny Sandoval
Songs written by Traa Daniels
Theme music